Arjun Ashokan (24 August 1992) is an Indian actor working in the Malayalam film industry. Known for his roles as a supporting actor, he is the son of Malayalam actor Harisree Ashokan.

Making his debut with Orkut Oru Ormakoot, along with a group of newcomers, Arjun first made a mark with Parava, the debut directorial of Soubin Shahir, and later with B. Tech and the sleeper hit June produced by Vijay Babu, and The Times of India described him as a scene stealer in his own right for the later film. Arjun was also noticed in films like Varathan, Unda,  Super Sharanya and An International Local Story, directed by his actor father Harisree Ashokan.

Personal life 
He married Nikhita Ganeshan in 2018.The couple have a daughter.

Filmography 

All films are in Malayalam language unless otherwise noted.

References

External links

Living people
Indian male film actors
21st-century Indian actors
Male actors in Malayalam cinema
1993 births